Jacob "Jake" Sprague (born December 27, 1984) is an American rugby union player and coach. He was born in Boston, Massachusetts. Sprague began his rugby career with the Babson College rugby union team, and later played at club level with Division 1 Mystic River Rugby Club. He later played for New York Athletic Club RFC in the Rugby Super League.

Sprague has played prop for the USA Eagles XV side. He was selected to tour with the USA Eagles squad for the Autumn 2010 tour of Europe. His international debut was in November 2009 against Uruguay.

External links
 Player Profile eaglesxv.com
 Player Profile USA Rugby
 Jacob Sprague player profile, Scrum.com

1984 births
Living people
American rugby union players
United States international rugby union players
Rugby union props
Sportspeople from Boston
Mystic River Rugby players